Tivela stultorum, also known as the Pismo clam, is a species of large, edible, saltwater clam, a marine bivalve mollusk in the family Veneridae, the Venus clams. This species is native to the eastern Pacific Ocean. As the name implies, the Pismo clam lives in Pismo Beach, California. It has been found at least as far south as 300 miles south of the US–Mexico border in Baja California on the Pacific Ocean side, where strong surf sometimes washes ashore live clams. The indigenous peoples of California used this species for food.

References

External links
 Info page on Sealifebase.org

Clams
Seafood in Native American cuisine
Veneridae
Bivalves described in 1823